The building at 42 Edward J. Lopez Avenue is a rare Federal period house in East Cambridge, Massachusetts. The two story wood-frame building has a hip roof and very simple styling. It was built about 1830, during the first period of East Cambridge's development after construction of the West Boston Bridge, and was moved to its present location c. 1900, probably as part of construction work in the area. The nature of the terrain in the area at that time means it cannot have been moved very far.

The house was listed on the National Register of Historic Places in 1982.

See also
National Register of Historic Places listings in Cambridge, Massachusetts

References

Houses on the National Register of Historic Places in Massachusetts
Houses in Cambridge, Massachusetts
National Register of Historic Places in Cambridge, Massachusetts
1830 establishments in Massachusetts
Federal architecture in Massachusetts